Marc Ginsberg is an American violinist, and principal second violinist of the New York Philharmonic Orchestra.

Life
He graduated from The Juilliard School, where he studied with Margaret Pardee, Ivan Galamian, and Paul Makanowitzky. He was a Fulbright scholar.
He formed the Cleo Quartet, and played with the Aeolian Chamber Players.

He plays solos for the orchestra, including the Vivaldi "Concerto for Four Violins",
and Elgar, "Introduction and Allegro for Strings".

Family
He is married to the violinist Judith Ginsberg.
He is a friend of Emanuel Ax.

References

External links
"Release 24: Gergiev Conducts Stravinsky", Instant Encore
Alan Gilbert chats with Marc Ginsberg, Principal, Second Violin Group, and wife, Judith Ginsberg

American male violinists
Juilliard School alumni
Living people
21st-century American violinists
21st-century American male musicians
Year of birth missing (living people)